Inside Story is a 1939 American drama film directed by Ricardo Cortez and written by Jerome Cady. The film stars Michael Whalen, Jean Rogers, Chick Chandler, Douglas Fowley, John 'Dusty' King and Jane Darwell. The film was released on March 10, 1939, by 20th Century Fox.

Plot

Cast      
Michael Whalen as Barney Callahan
Jean Rogers as June White
Chick Chandler as Snapper Doolan
Douglas Fowley as Gus Brawley
John 'Dusty' King as Paul Randall
Jane Darwell as Aunt Mary Perkins
June Gale as Eunice
Spencer Charters as Uncle Ben Perkins
Theodore von Eltz as Whitey
Cliff Clark as Collins
Charles D. Brown as J.B. Douglas
Charles Lane as District Attorney
Jan Duggan as Flora
Louise Carter as Dora
Bert Roach as Hopkins

References

External links 
 

1939 films
20th Century Fox films
American drama films
1939 drama films
American black-and-white films
Films directed by Ricardo Cortez
1930s English-language films
1930s American films